Chat  is a British weekly women's magazine, published through Future plc.

History and profile
Chat was launched in 1985. The magazine also includes weekly features such as: Ooo...Spooky! and Ruth the Truth, Your Stars, Ahh Kids, Write to Chat, Blimey! That's clever, and On the Telly, among others. As well as including features, the magazine may include puzzles, such as sudokus, crosswords, word search or arrowords. Indeed, the magazine publishes a spin-off magazine devoted to arrowords. Paul Merrill edited the magazine, which includes mostly real life stories.

The phrase chat mags has been used to add a collective term to describe the weekly, low-priced, casual-read magazines marketed at women, in the same way that the phrase "lad's mags" is used to describe a similar category of men's magazines.

Reception and circulation
For the second part of 2013 the circulation of Chat was 331,102 copies.

References

External links

1985 establishments in the United Kingdom
Lifestyle magazines published in the United Kingdom
Magazines established in 1985
Weekly magazines published in the United Kingdom
Women's magazines published in the United Kingdom